"Middle of the Night" is a song by British band The Vamps and Danish DJ and producer Martin Jensen. The dubstep-infused song was released as a digital download on 28 April 2017 by Virgin EMI Records and served as the second single from their number one third studio album Night & Day, being included on the first part of it, called Night Edition.

Music video
A music video was released on 15 May 2017. The video portrays a deaf couple arguing in sign language during dinner. It featured the deaf actress Rose Ayling-Ellis.

Track listing

Charts

Certifications

Release history

References

2017 songs
2017 singles
The Vamps (British band) songs
Martin Jensen songs
Songs written by Ed Drewett
Songs written by Matt Rad
Virgin EMI Records singles